is a Japanese Nippon Professional Baseball pitcher for the Hanshin Tigers in Japan's Central League.

External links

Living people
1983 births
Baseball people from Fukui Prefecture
Japanese expatriate baseball players in the Dominican Republic
Nippon Professional Baseball pitchers
Chunichi Dragons players
Hanshin Tigers players
Estrellas Orientales players